Bula is a Brazilian alternative rock band from Santos, São Paulo, originally composed by former members of the bands Charlie Brown Jr. and A Banca.

History
The band was conceived in mid-2014 by the remaining members of A Banca (with the exception of Thiago Castanho), formed in April of the previous year by former members of Charlie Brown Jr. after the death of its vocalist Chorão; however, A Banca only lasted for five months due to the suicide of its frontman, Champignon. Guitarist/lead vocalist Marcão, bassist Helena "Lena" Papini and drummer Bruno Graveto teamed up to continue making music, dubbing their new group "Bula" in reference both to the papal bull and the seal used to authenticate it, the bulla; as Marcão explained, all of the bandmembers "have their fates sealed together as in a pact". Graveto's stay on the band was short-lived though, as he eventually got busy with other commitments with pop rock band Strike, and was replaced by André Pinguim.

In November 2014 Bula released its debut album, Não Estamos Sozinhos, through Deckdisc. Music videos were later made for "Doses Gigantes" and "O Sol Dela Brilhou", and in the following year they made their breakthrough performance at Lollapalooza. In 2016, André Freitas, who produced Não Estamos Sozinhos, joined them as a second guitarist.

In May 2019 the band released its second album, Realidade Placebo. Later in December they announced on their official Instagram account the departure of Lena Papini.

Discography

Studio albums

Line-up

Current members
 Marcão – lead vocals, electric guitar (2014–present)
 André Pinguim – drums, vocals, beatboxing (2014–present)
 André Freitas – electric guitar (2016–present)

Former members
 Bruno Graveto – drums (2014)
 Helena "Lena" Papini – bass guitar (2014–2019)

References

External links
  

Musical groups established in 2014
2014 establishments in Brazil
Musical groups from São Paulo (state)
Musical trios
Brazilian alternative rock groups
Rap rock groups
Skate punk groups
Reggae rock groups
Brazilian pop rock music groups
Rapcore groups
Funk rock musical groups